The École normale supérieure de jeunes filles (also, École normale supérieure de Sèvres) was a French institute of higher education, in Sèvres, now a commune in the suburbs of Paris. The school educated girls only, especially as teachers for the secondary education system. It was founded on 29 July 1881 on the initiative of Camille Sée, following the Sée-inspired act of the legislature which established lycées for girls.

History
On the school's founding, French Minister of National Education Jules Ferry named the philosopher and educator Julie Velten Favre director of the institution. The school was initially housed in the former buildings of the Manufacture nationale de Sèvres, from which it was ejected in 1940; it was reinstated in the Boulevard Jourdan, in the 14th arrondissement. It existed until 1985, when it merged with the École normale supérieure, Rue d'Ulm, forming a co-educational school.

Directors (1881–1988) 
 Julie Favre (Madame Jules Favre) 1881–1896
 Madame  née Jeanne Marie Hall: 1896-1906
 Louise Belugou : 1906–1919
 Anne Amieux : 1919–1936
 Eugénie Cotton : 1936–1941
 Edmée Hatinguais : 1941–1944
 Lucy Prenant : 1944–1956
  : 1956–1974
  : 1974–1988

Notable students
Yvonne Choquet-Bruhat
Marie Duflo
Jeanne Galzy
Paulette Libermann
Assia Djebar
Luce Pietri

Faculty
Élie Cartan
Eugénie Cotton
Marie Curie
Jacqueline Ferrand
Paul Langevin
André Lichnerowicz
Jean Perrin

See also
École normale supérieure

References

Grandes écoles
Écoles Normales Supérieures
1881 establishments in France
Education in Paris
14th arrondissement of Paris
Grands établissements